Crematogaster auberti is a species of ant in tribe Crematogastrini. It was described by Emery in 1869.

References

auberti
Insects described in 1869